The golf competitions at the 2017 Southeast Asian Games in Kuala Lumpur, were held at The Mines Resort and Golf Club in Selangor.

In 2017 edition, men's (individual and team) and women's (individual and team) tournaments were contested.

Schedule
The golf tournaments at the 2017 Southeast Asian Games were held in five consecutive days, respectively 22 August to 26 August 2017.

Participation

Participating nations

Medal summary

Medal table
 Host nation (Malaysia)

Medalists

References

External links
 

2017
2017 Southeast Asian Games
2017 Southeast Asian Games events
Southeast Asian Games